Roman Halter (7 July 1927 in Chodecz – 30 January 2012) was a Polish painter, sculptor, writer, architect and Holocaust survivor.
He managed to escape from a cart while on a transport to Chełmno extermination camp. His mother, sister and her family were murdered in Chełmno. After the war he moved to Britain and became an architect, establishing practices in London and Cambridge.
In 2007 he published a biographical book, Roman's Journey.

Further reading
David Glasser (2014), Roman Halter - Life and Art through Stained Glass, Ben Uri Gallery And Museum

References 

1927 births
2012 deaths
Polish painters
Polish male painters
Holocaust survivors
People from Włocławek County